The 2013 Arizona State Sun Devils football team represented Arizona State University in the 2013 NCAA Division I FBS football season. They were led by second-year coach Todd Graham and played their home games at Sun Devil Stadium. They were a member of the South Division of the Pac-12 Conference. The Sun Devils had their best season since 2007, finishing 10–4 and earning a spot in the Pac–12 Championship Game. They also increased their win total and played in a bowl game for the third consecutive season. During the season, the team was featured on The Drive, a weekly documentary series on the Pac-12 Network.

Previous season

The 2012 Sun Devils finished 8–5 (5–4 in the Pac-12) in Todd Graham's first season as head coach. They were invited to the Kraft Fight Hunger Bowl where they defeated Navy. It was the first time the Sun Devils won a bowl game since the 2005 season.

Players drafted

Reference:

Schedule

Game summaries

Sacramento State

1st quarter scoring: ASU – De'Marieya Nelson 16 yard pass from Taylor Kelly (Gonzalez kick); ASU – Kevin Ozier 41 yard pass from Taylor Kelly (Gonzalez kick).

2nd quarter scoring: ASU – Marion Grice 6 yard run (Gonzalez kick); ASU – Jaelen Strong 24 yard pass from Taylor Kelly (Gonzalez kick); ASU – Chris Coyle 33 yard pass from Taylor Kelly (Gonzalez kick); ASU – Marion Grice 26 yard pass from Taylor Kelly (Gonzalez kick).

3rd quarter scoring: ASU – Zane Gonzalez 40 yard kick; ASU – Michael Eubank 4 yard run (Gonzalez kick).

4th quarter scoring: ASU – Zane Gonzalez 29 yard kick.

Wisconsin

1st quarter scoring: ASU – Zane Gonzalez 34 yard kick.

2nd quarter scoring: WIS – Jacob Pedersen 2 yard pass from Joel Stave (French kick); WIS – Beau Allen 0 yard fumble recovery (French kick); ASU – Marion Grice 1 yard run (Gonzalez kick); Zane Gonzalez 19 yard kick.

3rd quarter scoring: WIS – Melvin Gordon 80 yard run (French kick); ASU – Marion Grice 1 yard run.

4th quarter scoring: WIS – Kyle French 34 yard kick; ASU – Marion Grice 2 yard run; ASU – Marion Grice 12 yard run (Gonzalez kick); WIS – Melvin Gordon 1 yard run.

Controversial last play

After a couple more completions, the Badgers had the ball at the Sun Devil 13-yard line for 1st and 10. The Badgers were in possession of the football with 18 seconds left, hoping to kick a game-winning field goal. Upon the hike Quarterback Joel Stave knelt in the middle of the field to center the ball for their kicker. Stave then placed the ball quickly on the ground after the play was blown dead by the referee. Replays showed that Stave did get his knee down for a brief second, however Arizona State believed that it was a fumble, and ASU Anthony Jones dove on top of the ball, with the game clock running. At this point Badgers players signalled to the officials, pointing out the delay of game penalty by ASU due to Anthony being top of the football. Umpire Jack Folliard motioned to Stave acknowledging his knee, however the rest of the officiating crew allegedly did not see this signal. The umpire then spotted the ball after a significant delay, but told the Wisconsin offensive line to wait to line up, even though the clock continued to run. Finally, with approximately 2 seconds remaining, the umpire rushed behind the defensive line as Wisconsin tried to run a play to spike the ball and stop the clock but the clock reached zero before the ball was snapped and the game was over.

Initially after the game ASU coach Todd Graham stated "The quarterback put the ball on the ground while he was still standing up, he hadn't been tackled," and "So that should have been a turnover. That should have ended the game." And after watching the footage after the game he acknowledged the officiating error when he stated "You win or you lose. We won and let's move onto the next deal. Obviously, that was a very unusual deal."

The next day saw sports commentators and articles who reported on the "bizarre end" of the game in Tempe. Some even stated that Stave's knee did not touch the ground or that he crouched. This was later countered by other sports commentators, notably columnist Dennis Dodd of CBS Sports that the NCAA handbook states that one simply has to assimilate a kneeling motion.

Ultimately the Pac-12 reprimanded the officiating crew two days after the game ended, deeming that the officials had not acted with enough urgency during the end of the game. Pac-12 Commissioner Larry Scott made a statement when announcing the reprimand; "After a thorough review, we have determined that the officials fell short of the high standard in which the Pac-12 games should be managed. We will continue to work with all our officials to ensure this type of situation never occurs again."

Stanford

1st quarter scoring: STAN – Ty Montgomery 17 yard pass from Kevin Hogan (Williamson kick); STAN – Tyler Gaffney 1 yard run.

2nd quarter scoring: STAN – Anthony Wilkerson 12 yard run (Williamson kick); STAN – Ty Montgomery 30 yard pass from Kevin Hogan (Williamson kick); STAN – Luke Kaumatule punt block for safety.

3rd quarter scoring: ASU – Marion Grice 2 yard run (Gonzalez kick); STAN – Jordan Williamson 20 yard kick; STAN – Tyler Gaffney 16 yard run (Williamson kick).

4th quarter scoring: ASU – Chris Coyle 45 yard pass from Taylor Kelly (Gonzalez kick); ASU – Jaelen Strong 27 yard pass from Taylor Kelly (Gonzalez kick); ASU – Marion Grice 6 yard pass from Taylor Kelly (Gonzalez kick); STAN – Jordan Williamson 24 yard kick.

USC

1st quarter scoring: ASU – Michael Eubank 1 yard run (Gonzalez kick); USC – Justin Davis 26 yard run (Heidari kick).

2nd quarter scoring: USC – Tre Madden 10 yard pass from Cody Kessler (Heidari kick); ASU – Marion Grice 11 yard pass from Taylor Kelly (Gonzalez kick); ASU – Zane Gonzalez 28 yard kick; ASU – Zane Gonzalez 21 yard kick.

3rd quarter scoring: USC – Tre Madden 24 yard run (Heidari kick); ASU – D. J. Foster 74 yard pass from Taylor Kelly (Gonzalez kick); ASU – Alden Darby 46 yard interception return (Gonzalez kick); ASU – Marion Grice 8 yard pass from Taylor Kelly (Gonzalez kick); ASU – Marion Grice 9 yard run (Gonzalez kick).

4th quarter scoring: USC – Tre Madden 48 yard pass from Cody Kessler; USC – Justin Davis 15 yard run (Heidari kick); ASU – Marion Grice 28 yard run (Gonzalez kick); ASU – Deantre Lewis 1 yard run (Gonzalez kick); USC – Justin Davis 58 yard run (Heidari kick).

Notre Dame

1st quarter scoring:

2nd quarter scoring: ASU – Zane Gonzalez 40 yard kick; Zane Gonzalez 27 yard kick; ND – Ben Koyack 19 yard pass from Tommy Rees (Brindza kick); Jaelen Strong 36 yard pass from Taylor Kelly (Gonzalez kick); TJ Jones 8 yard pass from Tommy Rees (Brindza kick).

3rd quarter scoring: ND – Kyle Brindza 53 yard kick; ND – Troy Niklas 21 yard pass from Tommy Rees (Brindza kick).

4th quarter scoring: ASU – Osahon Irabor 37 yard interception return (Gonzalez kick); ND – Kyle Brindza 33 yard kick; ASU – De'Marieya Nelson 21 yard pass from Taylor Kelly (Gonzalez kick); ND – Kyle Brindza 25 yard kick; ND – Dan Fox 14 yard interception return (Brindza kick); ASU – Marion Grice 16 yard pass from Taylor Kelly (Gonzalez kick).

Colorado

1st quarter scoring: ASU – Jaelen Strong 69 yard pass from Taylor Kelly (Gonzalez kick); ASU – Marion Grice 8 yard run (Jaelen Strong pass from Mike Bercovici); ASU – Zane Gonzalez 26 yard kick; ASU – Marion Grice 1 yard run (Gonzalez kick).

2nd quarter scoring: COL – Nelson Spruce 10 yard pass from Sefo Liufau; ASU – Davon Coleman 1 yard pass from Taylor Kelly (Gonzalez kick); ASU – Davon Coleman sack for safety; ASU – Zane Gonzalez 41 yard kick; ASU – Zane Gonzalez 27 yard kick; ASU – Taylor Kelly 17 yard run (Gonzalez kick).

3rd quarter scoring: ASU – R.J. Robinson 1 yard run (Gonzalez kick).

4th quarter scoring: COL – Christian Powell 8 yard run (Oliver kick).

Washington

1st quarter scoring: WASH – Bishop Sankey 1 yard run (Coons kick); ASU – Zane Gonzalez 26 yard kick.

2nd quarter scoring: ASU – Marion Grice 15 yard pass from Taylor Kelly (Gonzalez kick); ASU – Zane Gonzalez 22 yard kick; ASU – Zane Gonzalez 36 yard kick; ASU – Taylor Kelly 1 yard run (Gonzalez kick); ASU – Chris Coyle 14 yard pass from Taylor Kelly (Gonzalez kick).

3rd quarter scoring: WASH – Kevin Smith 70 yard pass from Keith Price (Coons kick); ASU – Taylor Kelly 1 yard run (Gonzalez kick); WASH – Travis Coons 27 yard kick; ASU – Zane Gonzalez 21 yard kick.

4th quarter scoring: ASU – Marion Grice 1 yard run (Gonzalez kick); WASH – Austin Seferian-Jenkins 20 yard pass from Keith Price (Coons kick); ASU – Marion Grice 14 yard run (Gonzalez kick).

Washington State

1st quarter scoring: ASU – Taylor Kelly 7 yard run (Gonzalez kick); Taylor Kelly 6 yard run (Gonzalez kick); ASU – Jaelen Strong 11 yard pass from Taylor Kelly (Gonzalez kick).

2nd quarter scoring: WSU – Gabe Marks 34 yard pass from Connor Halliday (Furney kick); ASU – D.J. Foster 7 yard pass from Taylor Kelly (Gonzalez kick); ASU – Richard Smith 51 yard pass from Taylor Kelly (Gonzalez kick); ASU – Chris Coyle 8 yard pass from Taylor Kelly (Gonzalez kick); WSU – Rickey Galvin 15 yard pass from Connor Halliday (Furney kick).

3rd quarter scoring: WSU – Jeremiah Laufasa 4 yard run (Furney kick); ASU – D.J. Foster 23 yard pass from Taylor Kelly (Gonzalez kick).

4th quarter scoring: ASU – Zane Gonzalez 37 yard kick; ASU – Zane Gonzalez 36 yard kick.

Utah

1st quarter scoring: ASU – Taylor Kelly 10 yard run (Gonzalez kick); UTAH – Dres Anderson 8 yard pass from Travis Wilson.

2nd quarter scoring: UTAH – Andy Phillips 51 yard kick.

3rd quarter scoring: UTAH – Andy Phillips 43 yard kick; UTAH – Sean Fitzgerald 12 yard pass from Travis Wilson (Phillips kick).

4th quarter scoring: ASU – Taylor Kelly 2 yard run (Gonzalez kick); Richard Smith 14 yard pass from Taylor Kelly.

Oregon State

1st quarter scoring: ASU – Marion Grice 1 yard run (Gonzalez kick); ASU – D.J. Foster 8 yard run.

2nd quarter scoring: ASU – Marion Grice 1 yard run (Gonzalez kick); OSU – Trevor Romaine 22 yard kick.

3rd quarter scoring: OSU – Caleb Smith 6 yard pass from Sean Mannion (Romaine kick).

4th quarter scoring: ASU – Zane Gonzalez 18 yard kick; ASU – Robert Nelson 23 yard interception return (Gonzalez kick); OSU – Connor Hamlett 29 yard pass from Sean Mannion (Romaine kick).

UCLA

1st quarter scoring: ASU – Taylor Kelly 3 yard run (Gonzalez kick); UCLA – Devin Lucien 42 yard pass from Brett Hundley (Fairbarin kick); UCLA – Ka'imi Fairbairn 48 yard kick; ASU – D.J. Foster 3 yard run (Gonzalez kick).

2nd quarter scoring: ASU – Carl Bradford 18 yard interception return (Gonzalez kick); ASU – Michael Eubank 1 yard run (Gonzalez kick); UCLA – Ka'imi Fairbairn 23 yard kick; ASU – Jaelen Strong 19 yard pass from Taylor Kelly (Gonzalez kick).

3rd quarter scoring: UCLA – Myles Jack 3 yard run (Fairbairn kick); UCLA – Paul Perkins 1 yard run (Fairbairn kick); ASU – Zane Gonzalez 28 yard kick.

4th quarter scoring: UCLA – Shaquelle Evans 27 yard pass from Brett Hundley.

Arizona State clinched the Pac-12 South Division Title with this win.

Arizona

1st quarter scoring: ASU – Zane Gonzalez 38 yard kick; ASU – Zane Gonzalez 21 yard kick; ASU – Darwin Rogers 38 yard pass from Taylor Kelly (Gonzalez kick).

2nd quarter scoring: ASU – D.J. Foster 14 yard run (Gonzalez kick); ASU – De'Marieya Nelson 1 yard run (Gonzalez kick); UA – B.J. Denker 1 yard run (Smith kick); ASU – Zane Gonzalez 23 yard kick.

3rd quarter scoring: UA – Ka'Deem Carey 8 yard run (Smith kick); ASU – Damarious Randall 64 yard interception return (Gonzalez kick); UA – Garic Wharton 4 yard fumble recovery (Smith kick); ASU – Jaelen Strong 61 yard pass from Taylor Kelly (Gonzalez kick).

4th quarter scoring: ASU – D.J. Foster 7 yard run (Gonzalez kick); ASU – De'Marieya Nelson 1 yard run (Gonzalez kick).

Stanford (Pac-12 Championship Game)

 Sources:

1st quarter scoring: STAN – Tyler Gaffney 69-yard run (Jordan Williamson kick); ASU – D. J. Foster 51-yard run (Zane Gonzalez kick); STAN – Gaffney 1-yard run (Williamson kick)

2nd quarter scoring:  STAN – Ty Montgomery 22-yard run (Williamson kick); STAN – Gaffney 1-yard run (Williamson kick); ASU – Foster 65-yard  pass from Taylor Kelly (Gonzalez kick)

3rd quarter scoring: STAN – Williamson 30-yard field goal

4th quarter scoring: STAN – Montgomery 24-yard pass from Kevin Hogan (Williamson kick)

Texas Tech (Holiday Bowl)

Rankings

After the Season

Players Drafted

Reference:

References

Arizona State
Arizona State Sun Devils football seasons
Arizona State Sun Devils football